Ayman ibn ʿUbayd,  was an early Muslim and companion of the Islamic prophet Muhammad.

He was the son of Umm Ayman, who helped raise Muhammad, by her first husband Ubayd ibn Zayd of the Banu Khazraj tribe. Through his mother's second marriage to Zayd ibn Harithah, he was the half-brother of Usama ibn Zayd.

Ayman was killed fighting for the Muslim forces against enemy Arab tribes in the Battle of Hunayn.

Ayman's son, al-Hajjaj ibn Ayman was born during the lifetime of Muhammad and ahadith (traditions) of Muhammad have been quoted from al-Hajjaj in Islamic literature, including in the Sahih al-Bukhari.

Background 
Ayman was the son of Barakah, an Abyssinian, who served as a slave in the household of the Prophet's parents, Abdullah ibn Abdul-Muttalib and  Aminah bint Wahb. She became Muhammad's slave after the death of Aminah.

Following Aminah's death in Al-Abwa, Barakah looked after Muhammad, and moved with him to the household of his grandfather Abdul-Muttalib ibn Hashim in Mecca, where she served him during his childhood  and afterwards, in his adulthood.

When Muhammad married Khadija, he arranged for Barakah's freedom and marriage to a Khazrajite companion named Ubayd ibn Zayd. Through this marriage, Ayman was born, and thus she was known as "Umm Ayman" ("Mother of Ayman").

Ayman's father, Ubayd ibn Zayd, was killed fighting in the Battle of Khaybar.

Relationship with Muhammad 
Early Islamic sources refer to Ayman as one of the Muhajirun, meaning that he migrated from Mecca to Medina in order to escape the religious persecution of the Quraysh in Mecca.

Like his mother, Ayman entered into the service of Muhammad and was in charge of his water jug with which he made ablution. He was also a shepherd and cared for eight goats owned by Muhammad.

A hadith is reported from him. He affirms that Muhammad only cut off the hand of a thief if the item stolen had the value of a shield, at minimum, and a shield in those days was equal to the value of one gold coin. This hadith is corroborated by a report in Sahih al-Bukhari.

Death 

Ayman was killed fighting for the Muslim army in the Battle of Hunayn.

Ibn Kathir writes that according to Ibn Ishaq, Jabir ibn Abd Allah, who witnessed the battle, reported that the Muslim army were panicked by a surprise attack from the enemy and many men fled the battlefield. However, a group of Muhajirun stood firmly and defended Muhammad on the battlefield. These men were Abu Bakr, Umar, Ali, Abbas ibn Abd al-Muttalib, Abu Sufyan ibn al-Harith, Fadl ibn Abbas, Rabi'ah ibn al-Harith, Usama ibn Zayd and Ayman ibn Ubayd. Ayman was killed that day whilst defending Muhammad. For this reason, Ayman is considered a martyr in Islam.

After his martyrdom, Abbas ibn Abd al-Muttalib, Muhammad's uncle and one of those that fought with Ayman to defend Muhammad, composed a poem praising his steadfastness and bravery.

See also 
 Umm Ayman
 Usama ibn Zayd
 Bilal ibn Rabah
 List of non-Arab Sahabah
 Sahabah
 Afro-Arabs
 Ayman
 Aiman

References

Bibliography 
 
 
 
 
 
 

Non-Arab companions of the Prophet
630 deaths